Beyond the Darkness is a 1979 Italian exploitation horror film directed by Joe D'Amato. It follows Francesco (Kieran Canter), an orphaned taxidermist who inherits a house in the woods where he lives with his housekeeper Iris (Franca Stoppi), who is determined to become the new owner. After Iris kills his girlfriend Anna (Cinzia Monreale) with a voodoo curse, Francesco steals her corpse from the local cemetery. He then commits murders connected to his enduring passion for her. A local undertaker (Sam Modesto) investigates and meets Teodora (also Monreale), Anna's twin sister.

Filmed in two weeks in South Tyrol and Rome, Beyond the Darkness is a remake of the 1966 film The Third Eye. It was released in Italy to what Italian film historian Roberto Curti described as relatively poor box office, and was re-released in Italy in 1987 as In quella casa Buio omega to associate it with the La casa film series.

Plot 
Anna Völkl, the fiancé of taxidermist Francesco Koch, dies of an illness in the hospital during a final kiss after Iris, Francesco's wet nurse and housekeeper, stabs a voodoo doll. Back at the villa, Iris then breastfeeds Francesco for erotic lactation comfort.

Francesco injects Anna's body with preservative so that he can dig her body up and be with her forever.  Unbeknownst to Francesco, a funeral home employee sees him making the injection and becomes suspicious.  At night, Francesco digs up Anna's body. On the ride home, Frank picks up a hitchhiker. She falls asleep in the car, and Francesco starts stuffing Anna in his workshop. Francesco disembowels Anna and installs glass eyes into her sockets. When the hitchhiker spots Anna's corpse, she panics, and a struggle ensues. Francesco tortures her by ripping off some of her fingernails with a pair of pliers before choking her to death. When Francesco is not satisfied, Iris tries to comfort him once more, this time by masturbating him. Assisted by Francesco, Iris chops up the hitchhiker's corpse in the bathtub and disposes of the pieces in a hole in the woods.

A few days later, a jogger twists her ankle around Francesco's home, and he invites her in. They have sex on his bed, until Francesco reveals Anna's corpse right next to them. Once more, a fight ensues. Francesco bites her neck and eats a huge chunk of her flesh. He and Iris burn her corpse in the furnace downstairs.

Iris invites her old, eccentric relatives to dinner and announces her engagement to Francesco. Yet Francesco thinks otherwise and leaves her humiliated. The following day, while Iris is drunk and Francesco is out for a jog, the funeral home employee enters Frank's home to investigate, where he discovers Anna's body. Startled, he immediately leaves. That night, Francesco picks up a woman at a disco. Fortunately for her, Francesco just sends her off due to the arrival of Anna's twin sister Teodora. Teodora faints on seeing Anna's corpse, and Iris approaches her with a knife before Francesco intervenes. Francesco kills Iris, but not before she badly injures him by stabbing him in the groin and ripping his left eye out. Francesco, while Teodora remains unconscious, incinerates Anna's body in the furnace so he can be with Teodora. The funeral home employee then returns to confront Francesco and finds him badly injured near the furnace in his basement. Francesco passes out and dies.

The funeral home employee takes Teodora, who he thinks is Anna's deceased body, and returns it to the funeral home where he places it in a coffin for burial.  While he is sealing the coffin, Elena awakens, pushes the coffin open, and lets out a bloodcurdling scream.

Cast

Production
Beyond the Darkness was a remake of the 1966 film The Third Eye, which was an early vehicle for Franco Nero. Joe D'Amato purchased the rights from its director Mino Guerrini, who was a personal friend. The screenplay was written by Mino's son, Giacomo Guerrini.

The film was shot in two weeks in South Tyrol province, in the towns of Brixen and Sand in Taufers, in late June and early July 1979. The interiors were shot at Cine International Studios in Rome. On working with D'Amato, actress Franca Stoppi recalled him saying on set that "We're making a movie to make people throw up. We must make 'em vomit!" D'Amato said in an interview "I personally opted for the most unrestrained gore, since I don't consider myself very skillful at creating suspense....It's my most successful horror movie, and still stands out today above many others of its kind. It did very well commercially."

The special effects for the gore scenes in the film were made by using animal intestines, pig skin and a sheep's heart which were provided by an abattoir. D'Amato said "In all four (of my) horror films....we created the splatter effects by using butcher's scraps. There was no real special effects expert....At that time, censorship was fairly mild". D'Amato said the Italian prints were edited a bit, mainly shortening "the embalming scene and the one of the girl who gets cut to pieces in the bath...."

The film's score was by Goblin, who were hired by producer Marco Rossetti, and included music that would later be re-used in The Other Hell and Hell of the Living Dead.

Release
Beyond the Darkness was distributed theatrically in Italy by Eurocopfilms on 15 November 1979. The film grossed a total of 153.7 million Italian lire domestically. Italian film historian Roberto Curti stated that Beyond the Darkness performed "rather poorly at the Italian box office". The film has been released in a myriad of titles abroad, the most well-known being Beyond the Darkness. A version of the film was released in the United States titled Buried Alive in 1985 by ThrillerVideo. This version of the film has anglicized the names of the characters and is missing parts of the Italian theatrical version.

The film was re-released in Italy in 1987 as In quella casa Buio omega as an attempt to pass the film off as being related to the American films The Evil Dead and Evil Dead II which were released in Italy as La casa and La casa 2.  In Spain, the film was marketed as being a sequel in the House franchise as House 6: El terror continua and in Mexico as part of the Zombi series of film as Zombi 10.

Reception
From retrospective reviews, in his book reviewing gory horror films from the decade, Scott Aaron Stine declared that Beyond the Darkness was D'Amato's "strongest contributions to the [horror] genre", while still finding the film to be "cheap Italian trash [...] but it approaches the subject with a certain amount of flair not found in similar productions." Danny Shipka, who authored a book on exploitation films from Italy, France and Spain commented on the film, referring to it as "one sick puppy" and noting it "doesn't purport to offer any deep insight other than revulsion, and if the test of good Eurocult is to make the viewer wish he had a bath after watching one of its films, than [sic] Buio omega would be a classic."

References

Footnotes

Sources

External links 
 
 
 Beyond the Darkness at Variety Distribution

1970s Italian-language films
1979 films
1979 horror films
Films scored by Goblin (band)
Films directed by Joe D'Amato
Italian erotic horror films
Italian serial killer films
1970s exploitation films
Films shot in Italy
Necrophilia in film
Films about cannibalism
Remakes of Italian films
Italian splatter films
Italian exploitation films
1970s Italian films